The Corbett Brothers Auto Storage Garage is a building located in downtown Portland, Oregon, listed on the National Register of Historic Places.

See also
 National Register of Historic Places listings in Southwest Portland, Oregon

References

1926 establishments in Oregon
A. E. Doyle buildings
Commercial buildings completed in 1926
Garages (parking) on the National Register of Historic Places
National Register of Historic Places in Portland, Oregon
Portland Historic Landmarks
Southwest Portland, Oregon
Transportation buildings and structures on the National Register of Historic Places in Oregon